The 2008 Grand Prix de Futsal was the fourth edition of the international futsal competition of the same kind as the FIFA Futsal World Cup but with invited nations and held annually in Brazil.It was first held in 2005.

Venues

Fortaleza (Ceará, Brazil)
Halls: Ginásio Paulo Sarasate (Fortaleza), Ginásio da Universidade de Fortaleza (Unifor)

Fixtures

31 May 2008
Ginásio Paulo Sarasate
09.00 Serbia – Argentina 2–3 (0–2)
11.00 Brazil – Angola 12–0 (2–0)
13.00 Czech Republic – Paraguay 2–2 (2–1)
15.00 Chile – Croatia 0–3 (0–1)

Ginásio da Universidade de Fortaleza (Unifor)
13.00 Egypt – Venezuela 1–0 (0–0)
15.00 Canada – Ukraine 0–5 (0–1)
17.00 Colombia – Mozambique 5–1 (2–0)
19.00 Peru – Uruguay 1–6 (0–3)

01/06/2008
Ginásio Paulo Sarasate
12.30 Croatia – Brazil 0–7(0–5)
14.30 Uruguay – Czech Republic 0–3 (0–3)
16.30 Angola – Chile 3–2 (1–0)
18.30 Paraguay – Peru 4–1 (1–1)

Ginásio da Universidade de Fortaleza (Unifor)
10.00 Argentina – Egypt 5–0 (2–0)
12.00 Mozambique – Canada 6–2 (3–2)
14.00 Venezuela – Serbia 1–4 (0–2)
16.00 Ukraine – Colombia 3–3 (1–1)

02/06/2008
Ginásio Paulo Sarasate
15.00 Croatia – Angola 2–1 (0–0)
17.00 Uruguay – Paraguay 2–5 (0–1)
19.00 Brazil – Chile 11–0 (3–0)
21.00 Czech Republic – Peru 4–2 (2–2)

Ginásio da Universidade de Fortaleza (Unifor)
15.00 Egypt – Serbia 1–6 (1–3)
17.00 Canada – Colombia 1–2 (1–0)
19.00 Argentina – Venezuela 2–1 (1–1)
21.00 Mozambique – Ukraine 1–8 (1–5)

First stage

Group A

Group B

Group C

Group D

Second stage

Plate competition
Ginásio da Universidade de Fortaleza (Unifor)

Finals

15th/16th Place Match

13th/14th Place Match

11th/12th Place Match

9th/10th Place Match

Cup competition
Ginásio Paulo Sarasate (Fortaleza)

Finals

7th/8th Place Match

5th/6th Place Match

3rd/4th Place Match

1st/2nd Place Match

Winner

2008 Grand Prix de Futsal Final Standings
01. 
02. 
03. 
04. 
05. 
06. 
07. 
08. 
09. 
10. 
11. 
12. 
13. 
14. 
15. 
16.

References

Grand Prix de Futsal
Grand Prix de Futsal
Grand Prix De Futsal, 2008